Melissa J. Brown (born 3 March 1963) is an American sociocultural anthropologist and historian specializing in China and Taiwan. She earned a bachelor's and a master's degree from Stanford University, and completed doctoral study at the University of Washington.

Selected publications

References 

1963 births
Living people
American women anthropologists
Historians of China
Historians of Taiwan
20th-century American women writers
American women historians
21st-century American women writers
21st-century American historians
20th-century American historians
University of Washington alumni
Stanford University alumni
American sinologists